The Men's 100 metre individual medley competition of the 2021 FINA World Swimming Championships (25 m) was held on 18 and 19 December 2021.

Records
Prior to the competition, the existing world and championship records were as follows.

Results

Heats
The heats were started on 18 December at 09:30.

Semifinals
The semifinals were started on 18 December at 18:14.

Final
The final was held on 19 December at 18:13.

References

Men's 100 metre individual medley